Yokohama Excellence is a Japanese professional basketball club that will compete in the third division of Japan's B.League. Prior to the B.League's establishment, the club played in the National Basketball Development League, winning the championship in all three years of the league's existence. The team's home arena was the Itabashi Azusawa Gymnasium in Itabashi, Tokyo. The team also played some home matches at the Izumi Citizen's Gymnasium in Tachikawa, Tokyo.

History
The club's roots lie in an amateur club named Excellence formed by Dr.  in 2002. The team unsuccessfully sought entry into the reformed Japan Basketball League (JBL) in 2007 and thereafter continued to compete at the amateur level. The team was coached by American Bob Pierce for four years from 2002 until 2005.

NBDL (2013–2016)
In July 2012 Tsuji announced on his blog that he had successfully gained entry for the club into the National Basketball Development League (NBDL), a new league that was to commence in 2013 as a replacement of the second division of the JBL. In the same announcement Tsuji declared the goal was for the Excellence to be promoted to the first division NBL by 2015, which would make the club the first Tokyo-based fully professional club in the top league run by the Japan Basketball Association. At that time, most teams participating in JBA-sanctioned leagues were corporate teams and most players were employed by the parent corporations rather than paid as professional athletes. Tsuji also said that the amateur Excellence team coached by Tsuji would continue to exist under the umbrella of the professional club, which would be named Tokyo Excellence.

Tokyo Excellence was the only new team to compete in the inaugural season of the NBDL, the other teams in the 10-team league having competed in the JBL2 the previous season. The club was coached by American Michael Olson in their first season and led by two American import players, Joe Wolfinger and Markhuri Sanders-Frison. Excellence had a successful first season, finishing in second place on the standings with a 29–3 win–loss record, with all of their losses coming at the hands of the first-placed Toyota Tsusho Fighting Eagles. The Excellence defeated the Aisin AW Areions in the semi-final and then overcame the Fighting Eagles 93–77 in the final to claim the championship title after trailing 38–32 at half time.  scored 33 points in the final and won the playoff MVP award. Five Excellence players including Karino and Wolfinger were selected for the Eastern Conference's All-Star team.

Olson moved to the NBL's Hitachi Sunrockers during the 2014 off-season and the Excellence hired Shinya Tagata as his replacement for the 2014–15 season. The Excellence and Fighting Eagles again led the league throughout the season, with both teams securing a playoff berth in early February The Excellence ended the regular season with a 27–5 record, again finishing in second place behind the Fighting Eagles. The Excellence overcame Tokyo rivals Earth Friends Tokyo Z in the semi-final before defeating the Areions in the final, with the Excellence's Sanders named as playoff MVP.

The Excellence signed Amjyot Singh and Amritpal Singh, both members of India's national basketball team, in August 2015. Amjyot finished the 2015–16 as the league's second-best shot blocker (1.6 blocks per game) and Amritpal finished third in the league in field goal percentage (55.1%). With guard  as captain, the Excellence finished in third place with a 25–11 win–loss record. Karino was named to the league's first five and Tagata won the coach of the year award, despite the club announcing nine days before the final that Tagata would not be returning to the club the following year. The club again prevailed in the playoffs, defeating the Fighting Eagles 89–70 in the final to secure a third consecutive championship. Karino led the scoring in the final with 23 points, and  contributed 16 points and 7 rebounds to be named playoff MVP.

B.League (2016–)
In August 2015 it was announced that the Excellence would play in the second division of the B.League, a new three-division league created from the merger of the NBL, NBDL and bj league that is to start competition in September 2016. The 2016 off-season saw major changes in both playing and coaching staff. Masaki Hayamizu, who coached the Tokyo Hachioji Trains the previous season, was hired as the head coach in July. B.League rules limit second division teams to two import players and one naturalized player; the Excellence signed 22-year-old centre and Colorado Mesa University graduate Ryan Stephan and former Renova Kagoshima forward/centre Luke Evans as their imports. The team will commence their first B.League campaign with home games against former NBDL team Earth Friends Tokyo Z on 24 and 25 September 2016.

Players

Current roster

Notable former players

Samuel Deguara
 Luke Evans (fr)
 Yoshinori Kaneta
 Yusuke Karino
 Markhuri Sanders-Frison
 Amjyot Singh
 Amritpal Singh
 Ryan Stephan [tl]

Coaches
Robert Pierce
Dan Weiss
Michael Olson
Masaki Hayamizu
Takaki Ishida

Arenas
Yokohama Budokan
Itabashi Azusawa Gymnasium
Arena Tachikawa Tachihi
Higashimurayama Citizens Sports Center 
Kitamoto City Sports Center

Practice facilities
 Kato Factory Arena

References

External links
Asia-Basket.com Profile
Presentation on facebook

 
Basketball teams in Japan
Basketball in Tokyo
Basketball teams established in 2012
2012 establishments in Japan